Živilė Vaiciukevičiūtė (born 3 April 1996) is a female professional race walker who competes internationally for Lithuania.

She finished 8th in 2015 European Junior Championships. In 2016 after national trials she was selected to represent Lithuania in 2016 Summer Olympics. In 2019 Vaiciukevičiūtė achieved qualification standard for 2020 Olympics, but in June 2020 athlete announced about her retirement from sport and withdrawal from Olympic team.

Her twin sister Monika Vaiciukevičiūtė also competes in race walking.

Personal bests

References

External links
 
 
 
 

1996 births
Living people
Lithuanian female racewalkers
Athletes (track and field) at the 2016 Summer Olympics
Olympic athletes of Lithuania